Combat Leader is a 1983 video game published by Strategic Simulations.

Gameplay
Combat Leader is a game in which the player goes against the computer in a platoon level tactical wargame.

Reception
Floyd Mathews reviewed the game for Computer Gaming World, and stated that "Twentieth century small unit tactics is a very complex subject, and this program realistically portrays the uncertainties and hazards faced by a modern mechanized company commander."

Reviews
Zzap! - May, 1985
Computer Gaming World - Nov, 1991

References

External links
Addison Wesley Book of Atari Software 1984
Review in Antic
Review in Commodore Power/Play
Review in ANALOG Computing
Review in Videogaming Illustrated
Review in Family Computing
Review in GAMES Magazine
Review in Micro Adventurer
Article in Commodore Horizons

1983 video games
Atari 8-bit family games
Commodore 64 games
Computer wargames
Strategic Simulations games
Tank simulation video games
Turn-based strategy video games
Video games developed in the United States